Carussa or Karoussa, also spelt as Carusa or Karousa (Καροῦσα), also known as Polichnion, was a Greek trading place (emporium) on the Black Sea coast of ancient Paphlagonia, south of Sinope, and 150 stadia from it. It is also mentioned in the Periplus of Pseudo-Scylax as a Greek city; and by Pliny the Elder. It was a member of the Delian League as it appears in tribute lists of ancient Athens.

It is located near Gerze in Asiatic Turkey.

References

Populated places in ancient Paphlagonia
Former populated places in Turkey
History of Sinop Province
Members of the Delian League
Ancient Greek archaeological sites in Turkey